Microloa is a monotypic beetle genus in the family Cerambycidae described by Per Olof Christopher Aurivillius in 1924. Its only species, Microloa niveopunctata, was described by the same author in the same year

References

Apomecynini
Beetles described in 1924
Monotypic beetle genera